The 2010 Qatar Crown Prince Cup was the 16th edition of the cup tournament in men's football (soccer). It is played by the top-4 teams of the Qatar Stars League after the end of each season.

2010 Participants
 Al-Gharrafa : 2009–10 Qatar Stars League Champion
 Al-Sadd : 2009–10 Qatar Stars League Runner-up
 Al-Arabi : 2009–10 Qatar Stars League 3rd Place
 Qatar SC : 2009–10 Qatar Stars League 4th Place

Bracket

Match details

Semi-finals

Final

References
Goalzz.com

Qatar Crown Prince Cup
2009–10 in Qatari football